Tebentafusp, sold under the brand name Kimmtrak, is an anti-cancer medication used to treat uveal melanoma (eye cancer). Tebentafusp is a bispecific gp100 peptide-HLA-directed CD3 T cell engager.

The most common side effects include cytokine release syndrome, rash, pyrexia (fever), pruritus (itching), fatigue, nausea, chills, abdominal pain, edema, hypotension, dry skin, headache, and vomiting.

Tebentafusp was approved for medical use in the United States in January 2022. The US Food and Drug Administration (FDA) considers it to be a first-in-class medication.

Medical uses 
Tebentafusp is indicated for HLA-A*02:01-positive adults with unresectable or metastatic uveal melanoma.

History 
Efficacy was evaluated in IMCgp100-202 (NCT03070392), a randomized, open-label, multicenter trial of 378 participants with metastatic uveal melanoma. Participants were required to be HLA-A*02:01 genotype positive identified by a central assay. Participants were excluded if prior systemic therapy or localized liver-directed therapy were administered. Prior surgical resection of oligometastatic disease was permitted. Participants with clinically significant cardiac disease or symptomatic, untreated brain metastases were excluded.

The U.S. Food and Drug Administration (FDA) granted Immunocore's application for tebentafusp priority review, breakthrough therapy, and orphan drug designations.

Society and culture

Legal status 
On 24 February 2022, the Committee for Medicinal Products for Human Use (CHMP) of the European Medicines Agency (EMA) adopted a positive opinion, recommending the granting of a marketing authorization for the medicinal product Kimmtrak, intended for the treatment of uveal melanoma. The applicant for this medicinal product is Immunocore Ireland Limited. Tebentafusp was approved for medical use in the European Union in April 2022.

References

External links 
 
 

Antineoplastic drugs
Breakthrough therapy
Orphan drugs